Heilbronner or Heilbroner is a surname. Notable people with the surname include:

Edgar Heilbronner (1921–2006), Swiss German chemist
Johann Christoph Heilbronner (1706–1745), German mathematical historian and theologian
Louie Heilbroner (1861–1933), manager in Major League Baseball
Robert Heilbroner (1919–2005), American economist and historian of economic thought

See also 
Emanuel Bronner (1908–1997)
Weber & Heilbroner, Lower Manhattan men's clothing company of the 20th century
 Heilbronner Hohenloher Haller Nahverkehr (HNV or H3NV), a regional transport cooperative
Heilbronn (disambiguation)

German-language surnames
Jewish surnames
Yiddish-language surnames